Cydalima laticostalis is a moth in the family Crambidae. It was described by Achille Guenée in 1854. It is found from India, Sri Lanka, Burma and Malaysia to the New Hebrides. It is also found in Australia, where it has been recorded from tropical Queensland.

The wings are satin white. There is a broad brown line along the costa of the forewings.

References

Moths described in 1854
Spilomelinae